Kalla Kulla is a 1975 Indian Kannada-language comedy drama film, directed by K. S. R. Das and produced by Shastry Associates. The story is written by M. D. Sundar. The film stars Vishnuvardhan, Dwarakish, Bhavani and Jayalakshmi. The film was widely appreciated for its songs and story upon release. The songs composed by Rajan–Nagendra were huge hits. The movie was dubbed in Hindi as Chor Ka Bhai Chor. H.R. Bhargava was the associate director of this movie. The director remade the movie in Telugu in 1976 as Kallanum Kullanum.

Cast 
 Vishnuvardhan as Mahesh "Kalla"
 Dwarakish as Ramesh "Kulla"
 Bhavani as Rupa
 Jayalakshmi
 Leelavathi as Padma, Kalla and Kulla's mother
 Vajramuni as Sukumar
 Thoogudeepa Srinivas as Sarvottama
 Tiger Prabhakar
 Rajanand as Kaushik
 Fighter Shetty as Tony
 Chethan
 Hanumanthachar

Soundtrack 

The music of the film was composed by Rajan–Nagendra and the lyrics were written by Chi. Udaya Shankar. The song "Suthha Muthha" was received extremely well.

References

External links 
 
 Songs at Raaga

1975 films
1970s Kannada-language films
Indian comedy films
Films directed by K. S. R. Das
Films scored by Rajan–Nagendra
1975 comedy films
Kannada films remade in other languages